King Faraday is a fictional secret agent featured in DC Comics. Faraday first appeared in Danger Trail #1 (July 1950), and was created by Robert Kanigher and Carmine Infantino.

Faraday's last appearance in the 1950s was in World's Finest Comics #64 (May-June 1953). He was picked up again after more than twenty-five years, in Batman #313 (July 1979).

Fictional character biography

He was named "King" by his father as a joke, a play on the phrase "King for a day".

An ex-soldier, he took a position as a counter-espionage agent for the U.S. government and engaged in a variety of standard spy-type capers. Some of his Danger Trail adventures were reprinted in Showcase #50 (May–June 1964) under the title "I-Spy". Faraday has since been incorporated full-bore into the DC Universe as a member of the Central Bureau of Intelligence. At one point, he was Nightshade's mentor. In fact, he had a hand in both her and Bronze Tiger being recruited into Task Force X. He has also teamed up with Batman a few times. On two of the occasions he has helped Batman in the capture of Two-Face.

One Year Later, he is a member of Checkmate, serving as the Bishop for White Queen Amanda Waller.

Faraday is part of The New 52: Futures End. He is working with Grifter to investigate alien and cross-dimensional spies on Earth.

Skills and abilities
Faraday possessed no superhuman abilities but was a trained espionage agent and an expert hand-to-hand fighter and marksman.

Other versions

New Frontier
Faraday plays a prominent role in the alternate universe series DC: The New Frontier by Darwyn Cooke. King Faraday is a Chicago native who leads an effort to contain and corral the large amount of super-powered entities appearing including orchestrating "Project Flying Cloud" with Carol Ferris, Col. Rick Flag Sr. and Col. Hal Jordan. King uses various illegal methods, such as laying a trap for Barry Allen with a robotic Gorilla Grodd, even though he has not committed any crimes. Despite all this, he forms a friendship with one of his assignments: the Martian Manhunter after J'onn sacrificed his last chance to return home to save Faraday from a rocket. He is killed in the last issue of the series while defending his friend from a psychic attack from The Centre.

Smallville
King Faraday appears in Smallville Season 11, based on the TV series. Faraday is a Checkmate agent who looks after a female White Martian, and raises her as a daughter, naming her Megan Morse. After Zod's attack on the Castle (one of Checkmate's bases) during Season 9 episode "Sacrifice", she and Faraday stay locked inside the facility. Faraday ends up dying, and Megan escapes. His last transmissions were later found by Batman and Martian Manhunter in the remains of the Castle.

Tangent
King Faraday appears in the 1997 Tangent Comics one-shot Green Lantern. In this depiction he is a Moldavian exile who is fascinated by mysteries and has his own magazine "King Faraday Digest" based around his investigations and published by "The House Of Mystery" which was managed by Roy Raymond and originally owned by Alfred Pennyworth, until Pennyworth was bought out by "Ralph Digby" an obvious play on the Elongated Man Ralph Dibny.

In his appearance in Tangent Comics he is resurrected from the grave by the Green Lantern after his death during a plane malfunction. He is resurrected with the intention of completing his last mystery so he can return to the afterlife in peace.

In other media

Television
 King Faraday appears in Justice League Unlimited, voiced by Scott Patterson. His first appearance was in the episode "Double Date", in which he was a federal agent assigned to guard Steven Mandragora, but he escaped. It was established in the 3rd season opener "I Am Legion" that he was appointed as the Justice League's official liaison with the U.S. government. In the episode "To Another Shore", he and a group of government agents wearing jet packs appear in a scene, helping Wonder Woman in a fight against members of the Secret Society (who were trying to obtain the Viking Prince's corpse). One point of interest in the scene is when he refers to his fellow agents as "goldbrickin' yahoos", a catchphrase more associated with Nick Fury, a Marvel Comics character Faraday preceded.
 King Faraday appears in the Young Justice episode "Performance", voiced by Clancy Brown. He is shown as an Interpol agent investigating Jack Haly's Circus where everyplace that they had visited has had their tech robbed. King Faraday later arrives in Geneva with his fellow agents to arrest Parasite and places an inhibitor collar on him.

Film
 King Faraday appears in Justice League: The New Frontier, voiced by Phil Morris. In the film, Faraday is a Federal Agent who initially is against super powered beings who are not affiliated with the government. He and others agents take custody of a government rocket scientist that fled to Gotham. He later oversees the classified Mars mission and after noticing J’onn Jon’z attempting to board the rocket and attempts to apprehend the alien. J’onn ends up saving Faraday from being incinerated after knocking him unconscious. This act changes Faraday’s view of him and the two become friends. Faraday and J’onn soon arrive at an air force base to stop a standoff between US Soldiers and Heroes attempting to assist. Agreeing with Superman that the fear and paranoia between both sides must come to an end, Faraday shakes hands with Superman to end the hostilities. He later leads the ground forces against the Centre's dinosaur army. Faraday is gravely wounded by a T-Rex while protecting J'onn from a psychic attack by the Centre. Unable to escape from the T-Rex, Faraday ignites two grenades before being swallowed whole by the dinosaur, killing them both.
 King Faraday appears in Catwoman: Hunted, voiced by Jonathan Frakes.

References

External links
 DCU Guide: King Faraday chronology
 Cosmic Teams: King Faraday

Comics characters introduced in 1950
Characters created by Carmine Infantino
Characters created by Robert Kanigher
DC Comics superheroes
DC Comics male superheroes
Fictional secret agents and spies
King Faraday
Fictional government agents
Suicide Squad members